HLA-B67 (B67) is an HLA-B serotype. The serotype identifies the more common HLA-B*67 gene products. B67 is region specific recombinant haplotype formed by the gene conversion of B*39, an allele common along the Northwest Pacific Rim (Taiwan, Japan, Korea, Coastal Siberia), and B7, B22, or B27. (For terminology help see: HLA-serotype tutorial)

Serotype

By allele

References

6